Ridderbuurt is a hamlet in the Dutch province of South Holland. It is a part of the municipality of Alphen aan den Rijn, and lies about 2 km north of Alphen aan den Rijn. The statistical area "Ridderbuurt", which also can include the surrounding countryside, has a population of around 120.

References

External links
 homepage of the Ridderbuurt

Populated places in South Holland
Alphen aan den Rijn